Star Wraith (1999–2000) was the first game made by Star Wraith 3D Games with the title Star Wraith as well as the first game of the Star Wraith series. It superseded Raven and Star Wolf, the third and fourth official games made by SW3DG respectively. While its predecessors were written in QuickBasic, Star Wraith was written entirely in DarkBASIC.

Graphics 

Star Wraith was the first SW3DG game to feature the 3D radar display present in all current games. It also had fully animated explosions and 3D textured models. Like Star Wolf, there was no visible cockpit, allowing for better graphics elsewhere.

Gameplay 

Star Wraith featured a fully random campaign. It generated random missions with random numbers of ships. The player was allowed to change the number of ships in the fleet, which changed the difficulty of the missions generated (smaller fleets meant easier missions).

In addition to the random campaign, the player is allowed to play a mode called "instant action", which has three modes:

 Create mission: Allows player to set basic parameters to generate a level.
 Freeflight: Allows player to fly around in empty space with no enemies.
 Gauntlet: Test of how many randomly generated flights the player can survive.

There are also a number of types of missions for each flight:

 Strike: Basic fight between two fleets
 Joint Strike: Fight between two allied fleets and one enemy fleet
 Bomb: Just like strike, except the player drives a different ship called the F-144C-B, which is slower and equipped with two nuclear missiles. The player can destroy the enemy capital ship using these missiles; however, since Star Wraith lacks a score system, doing so has no effect on the game.
 Defend: Player has to intercept a number of missiles before they reach the capital ship.

Campaign 

The Star Wraith campaign was normally randomly generated by default. However, by editing game text files, it was possible to create a linear campaign. Star Wraith was limited, however, and creation of one's own campaign was virtually pointless.

Story 

Star Wraith has a basic story which only served to explain why the combat was going on: There is a war going on between the Alliance and the United Federation Allegiance (UFA) during the course of the game. However, details of the war are not revealed in large amounts.

Star Wraith and Star Wraith II do not easily seem to flow into the stories of Star Wraith III and Star Wraith IV. This seems to suggest that Star Wraith and Star Wraith II are no longer canon. The most important factor is that time scales do not seem to match between games.

References 

2000 video games
Star Wraith
Video games developed in the United States
Windows games
Windows-only games